Babalola Oluwagbemiga Gabriel (born August 1, 1980) known professionally as Bigiano, is a Nigerian songwriter, singer,record producer, recording artist, and stage performer, Known for his block busting single “Shayo"

Early life and education 
Babalola Oluwagbemiga Gabriel is the fourth in a family of six, from Osun State, he started his music career as a choirmaster and music coordinator in church.

He studied computer science at the Obafemi Awolowo University.

His passion for the entertainment world lured him into teaming up with other like minds to start a musical group known as Triple B.

In 1999, the group released an official single called "Egba Mi"

Career 
In 2009, the dancehall music star got nominated back to back, for the MTV Africa Music Awards and Nigeria Entertainment Awards' Best New Act alongside M.I.

In same year, Bigiano was the cynosure of all eyes at a high octane awards' ceremony as his block buster single, “Shayo” won Best Video, Best Cinematography and Viewers’ Choice of The Year Awards at the 2009 Sound City Music Video Awards.

And as if this was not enough, the star musician crowned the year with musical tour in and around the South African territories.

In 2012, Bigiano who has worked with several great artistes such as Tu Face Idibia, among others featured a fellow Nigerian artiste Wizkid on his single “Chillings”

Discography

Albums 
 Shayo master – 2008

Singles 
 "It's Over" feat. General Pype
 "Chillings" feat. Wizkid 
 "As E Dey Hot" 
 "One & Only"
 "Ibile"
 "Tonight" 
 "Chiquito" 
 "I Be Somebody"
 "BFF"
 "Norty"
 "Who's That Girl"
 "Go Crazy"

Awards and nominations

References 

1988 births
Nigerian singer-songwriters
21st-century Nigerian singers
Living people